The 1856–57 United States Senate elections were held on various dates in various states. As these U.S. Senate elections were prior to the ratification of the Seventeenth Amendment in 1913, senators were chosen by state legislatures. Senators were elected over a wide range of time throughout 1856 and 1857, and a seat may have been filled months late or remained vacant due to legislative deadlock. In these elections, terms were up for the senators in Class 1.

The young Republican Party assumed its position as one of the United States's two main political parties.  The Whigs and Free Soilers were gone by the time the next Congress began.

Results summary 
Senate party division, 35th Congress (1857-1859)

 Majority party: Democratic (37–42)
 Minority party: Republican (20)
 Other party: American (4)
 Vacant: 1–0
 Total seats: 62–66

Change in composition

Before the elections 
After the January 14, 1856 special election in Pennsylvania.

As a result of the elections

Beginning of the next Congress

Race summaries

Elections during the 34th Congress 
In these elections, the winners were seated during 1856 or in 1857 before March 4; ordered by election date.

Races leading to the 35th Congress 
In these general elections, the winners were elected for the term beginning March 4, 1857; ordered by state.

All of the elections involved the Class 1 seats.

Elections during the 35th Congress 
In these elections, the winners were elected in 1857 after March 4; ordered by election date.

Complete list of states

Maryland  

Anthony Kennedy won election by an unknown margin of votes, for the Class 1 seat.

New York 

The New York election was held February 3, 1857, by the New York State Legislature.  Whig Hamilton Fish had been elected in 1851 to this seat, and his term would expire on March 3, 1857.

In 1855, the Whig Party and the Anti-Nebraska Party merged in New York to form the Republican Party.

At the State election in November 1855, 16 Republicans, 11 Americans, 4 Democrats and 1 Temperance man were elected for a two-year term (1856-1857) in the State Senate. At the State election in November 1856, 81 Republicans, 31 Democrats and 8 Americans were elected to the Assembly for the session of 1857. The 80th New York State Legislature met from January 6 to April 18, 1857, at Albany, New York.

Preston King was nominated by a caucus of Republican State legislators. King had been a Democratic congressman from 1843 to 1847, a Free Soil congressman from 1849 to 1853, and had joined the Republican Party upon its foundation at the State convention in September 1855. The convention nominated King for Secretary of State, but he was defeated by Joel T. Headley in a four-way race.  Secretary of State Joel T. Headley was the candidate of the American Party.  State Senator Daniel E. Sickles was the candidate of the Democratic Party.

In the Assembly the vote confirmed the party caucus selections. When State Senator Sickles received votes, the same objection to his eligibility was raised as was in 1833 regarding Nathaniel P. Tallmadge. This time, Speaker DeWitt C. Littlejohn ruled that the objection was "partially tenable and partially not so." However, the Speaker held that any member could vote for anybody, and only if the candidate received sufficient votes to win the election, a decision would be required. Otherwise, like in this case, the eligibility of an also-ran was irrelevant.

In the State Senate, only 24 votes were given. Zenas Clark (Rep.) and John B. Halsted (Rep.) were sick at home. Eaton J. Richardson (Rep.) paired with Sidney Sweet (Am.). Joseph H. Petty (Am.) was absent. William Kelly (Dem.), Mark Spencer (Dem.), and the Democratic candidate Sickles himself, declined to vote.

State Senator Justin A. Smith (Am.) raised the question if the vote for Sickles could be counted. A new State Constitution had been adopted in 1846, which had clarified the question of eligibility of State legislators. Smith quoted from the State Constitution: "No member of the Legislature shall receive any civil appointment within this State, or to the Senate of the United States, from the Governor, the Governor and Senate, or from the Legislature, during the term for which he shall have been elected; and all votes given for any such member, for any such office or appointment, shall be void." Lt. Gov. Henry R. Selden (later a judge of the New York Court of Appeals) decided to count the vote, holding that the United States Constitution described the eligibility for the office and devolved on the State legislatures only the power to prescribe the "times, places and manners of holding the elections for that office", thus not implying a right for the State governments to exclude any person who would be eligible under the U.S. Constitution.

Preston King was the choice of both the Assembly and the Senate, and was declared elected.

Pennsylvania

Pennsylvania (special) 

The Class 3 election was held on January 14, 1856. William Bigler was elected by the Pennsylvania General Assembly to the United States Senate.

The Pennsylvania General Assembly had previously convened on February 13, 1855, for the regularly scheduled Senate election for the term beginning on March 4, 1855. Two ballots were recorded on February 13, followed by three on February 27, 1855. On the fifth and final ballot during this convention, former Senator Simon Cameron had led with 55 votes to future Senator Charles R. Buckalew's 23. No candidate was elected, however, and the hung election convention adjourned by a vote of 66 to 65. Upon the expiration of incumbent James Cooper's term on March 4, 1855, the seat was vacated and would remain vacant until William Bigler's election in January 1856.

On January 14, 1856, the election convention of the General Assembly re-convened and elected Democratic former Governor of Pennsylvania William Bigler on the first ballot to serve the remainder of the term that began on March 4, 1855 and would expire on March 4, 1861. The results of the vote of both houses combined are as follows:

|-
| colspan="3" align="right" | Totals
| align="right" | 133
| align="right" | 100.00%

Pennsylvania (regular) 

The Class 1 election in Pennsylvania was held on January 13, 1857. Simon Cameron was elected by the Pennsylvania General Assembly to the United States Senate.

The Pennsylvania General Assembly convened on January 13, 1857, to elect a Senator to serve the term beginning on March 4, 1857. The results of the vote of both houses combined are as follows:

|-bgcolor="#EEEEEE"
| colspan="3" align="right" | Totals
| align="right" | 133
| align="right" | 100.00%

See also 
 1856 United States elections
 1856 United States presidential election
 1856–57 United States House of Representatives elections
 34th United States Congress
 35th United States Congress

References 

 Party Division in the Senate, 1789-Present, via Senate.gov
The New York Civil List compiled in 1858 (see: pg. 63 for U.S. Senators [gives wrong date "February 6"]; pg. 137 for State Senators 1857; pg. 252ff for Members of Assembly 1857)
STATE AFFAIRS.; The Election of Preston King as United States Senator in NYT on February 4, 1857
Result NY Senate: Journal of the Senate (80th Session) (1857; pg. 171)
Result NY Assembly: Journal of the Assembly (80th Session) (1857; pg. 245f)
 Pennsylvania Election Statistics: 1682-2006 from the Wilkes University Election Statistics Project